Balloon-occluded retrograde transvenous obliteration (BRTO) is an endovascular procedure used for the treatment of gastric varices. When performing the procedure, an interventional radiologist accesses blood vessels using a catheter, inflates a balloon (e.g. balloon occlusion) and injects a substance into the variceal blood vessels that causes blockage of those vessels. To prevent the flow of the agent out of the intended site (variceal blood vessels), a balloon is inflated during the procedure, which occludes.

Medical uses
BRTO is used for the treatment of bleeding from gastric varices. In addition to transjugular intrahepatic portosystemic shunt (TIPS), BRTO is a first line treatment for the prevention of recurrent bleeding from gastric varices (GOV2 or IGV1). BRTO may be used for the treatment of ectopic varices.

Complications
As BRTO results in a blockage of a portosystemic shunt, the procedure may result in increased portal hypertension, which may worsen esophageal varices or ascites.

History
BRTO was developed as a procedure in the early 1990s. Initially, the procedure was performed using ethanolamine oleate as a sclerosant. Between 2006 and 2007, American physicians began using sodium tetradecyl sulfate (3% STS) as an alternative sclerosing agent.

See also
 Transjugular intrahepatic portosystemic shunt
 Distal splenorenal shunt procedure
 Portal venous system

References

Accessory digestive gland surgery
Hepatology
Implants (medicine)
Vascular surgery
Interventional radiology